Bleclic Peaks are two peaks near the southern end of the north–south trending Perry Range in Marie Byrd Land. Mapped by the United States Geological Survey from surveys and from U.S. Navy air photos, 1959–65, they were named by the Advisory Committee on Antarctic Names for John P. Bleclic, AGC, U.S. Navy, senior aerographer's mate on USS Glacier in these coastal waters, 1961–62.

References
 

Mountains of Marie Byrd Land